Woman Reading (La Liseuse) is an oil-on-board painting executed in 1895 by the French artist Henri Matisse. It is displayed at the Musée Matisse,  in  Le Cateau-Cambrésis, having been on loan from the Centre Pompidou since 2002. It shows a woman, dressed in black, seated and reading, with her back to the viewer, in the calmness of a somewhat cluttered room. Matisse incorporated a self-portrait into the painting in the form of a framed drawing hanging on the wall at the upper left.

References

External links
Le Câteau-Cambrésis, musée Matisse, Dépôt du Centre Pompidou, 2002

1895 paintings
Paintings by Henri Matisse
Paintings in the collection of the Musée National d'Art Moderne
Paintings in Hauts-de-France
Books in art